The Ministry of Human Resources, abbreviated MOHR, is a ministry of the Government of Malaysia that is responsible for skills development, labour, occupational safety and health, trade unions, industrial relations, industrial court, labour market information and analysis, social security.

Organisation
Minister of Human Resources
Deputy Minister of Human Resources
Secretary-General
Under the Authority of Secretary-General
Legal Division
Internal Audit Unit
Corporate Communication Unit
Key Performance Indicator Unit
Integrity Unit
Deputy Secretary-General (Policy and International)
Policy Division
Institute of Labour Market Information and Analysis
International Division
National Wages Consultative Council
Deputy Secretary-General (Operations)
Development, Financial and Human Resources Division
Management Services Division
Account Division
Information Management Division
Inspectorate and Enforcement Division

Federal departments
 Department of Labour of Peninsular Malaysia, or Jabatan Tenaga Kerja Semenanjung Malaysia (JTKSM). (Official site)
 Department of Occupational Safety and Health (DOSH), or Jabatan Keselamatan dan Kesihatan Pekerjaan (JKKP). (Official site)
 Industrial Court of Malaysia, or Mahkamah Perusahaan Malaysia. (Official site)
 Manpower Department, or Jabatan Tenaga Manusia (JTM). (Official site)
 Department of Skills Development (DSD), or Jabatan Pembangunan Kemahiran. (Official site)
 Centre for Instructor and Advanced Skill Training (CIAST), or Pusat Latihan Pengajar dan Kemahiran Lanjutan. (Official site)
 Department of Trade Union Affairs, or Jabatan Hal Ehwal Kesatuan Sekerja (JHEKS). (Official site)
 Department of Labour Sarawak, or Jabatan Tenaga Kerja Sarawak. (Official site)
 Department of Labour Sabah, or Jabatan Tenaga Kerja Sabah. (Official site)
 Department of Industrial Relations Malaysia, or Jabatan Perhubungan Perusahaan Malaysia (JPP). (Official site)
 Productivity-Linked Wage System (PLWS), or Sistem Upah yang Dikaitkan dengan Produktiviti. (Official site)

Federal agencies
 Social Security Organisation (SOCSO), or Pertubuhan Keselamatan Sosial (PERKESO). (Official site)
 Human Resources Development Fund (HRDF), or Kumpulan Wang Pembangunan Sumber Manusia (KWPSM). (Official site)
 National Institute of Occupational Safety and Health (NIOSH), or Institut Keselamatan dan Kesihatan Pekerjaan Negara. (Official site)
 Skills Development Fund Corporation, or Perbadanan Tabung Pembangunan Kemahiran (PTPK). (Official site)
 Institute of Labour Market Information and Analysis (ILMIA), or Institut Maklumat Dan Analisa Pasaran Buruh. (Official site)

Key legislation
The Ministry of Human Resources is responsible for administration of several key Acts:

Occupation and Labour Standards
Employment Act 1955 [Act 265]
Labour Ordinance (Sabah Cap. 67)
Labour Ordinance (Sarawak Cap. 76)
Workers’ Minimum Standards of The Housing and Amenities Act 1990 [Act 446]
Children and Young Persons (Employment) Act 1966 [Act 350]
Private Employment Agencies Act 1981 [Act 246]
Anti-Trafficking in Persons Act 2007 [Act 670]
Employment (Restriction) Act 1968 (Revised 1988) [Act 353]
Employment Information Act 1953 [Act 159]
Holidays Act 1951 [Act 369]
Weekly Holidays Act 1950 [Act 220]
Holidays Ordinance (Sabah Cap. 56)
Public Holidays Ordinance (Sarawak Cap. 8)

Occupational Safety and Health
Factories and Machinery Act 1967 [Act 139]
Petroleum (Safety Measures) Act 1984 [Act 302]
Occupational Safety And Health Act 1994 [Act 514]

Industrial Relations
Industrial Relations Act 1967 [Act 177]
Trade Unions Act 1959 [Act 262]

Social Security
Employees' Social Security Act 1969 [Act 4]
Workmen’s Compensation Act 1952 [Act 273]
National Wages Consultative Council Act 2011 [Act 732]
Minimum Retirement Age Act 2012 [Act 753]

Skills Development
Pembangunan Sumber Manusia Berhad Act 2001 [Act 612]
Skills Development Fund Act 2004 [Act 640]
National Skills Development Act 2006 [Act 652]

Vision
To be the leading agency in the development and management of a world class workforce.

Mission
 To grow and increase a workforce that is productive, informative, discipline, caring and responsive to the changing labor environment towards increasing the economic growth and hence create more job opportunities.
 To encourage and maintain conducive and harmonised industrial relationships between employers, employees and trade unions for the nation's economic development and wellness of people.
 To uphold social justice and ensure harmonious industrial relations through solving industrial dispute between employer and employee and awarding collective agreement.
 To ensure trade unions practice democracy in an orderly manner and is responsible to assist achieving the objective of industrial harmony.
 To be the leader in development of nation's human resources.
 To ensure safety and health of workforce is assured.
 To develop skilled, knowledgeable and competitive workforce in a harmonious industrial relations with social justice.

See also
Minister of Human Resources (Malaysia)

References

External links
 Ministry of Human Resources
 

 
Federal ministries, departments and agencies of Malaysia
Malaysia, Human Resources
Labour in Malaysia